Varnaq (also Romanized as Varanagh and Verana) is a village in Sard-e Sahra Rural District, in the Central District of Tabriz County, East Azerbaijan Province, Iran. At the 2006 census, its population was 470, in 118 families.

References 

Populated places in Tabriz County